Fredrik Strømstad (born 20 January 1982 in Kristiansand) is a Norwegian football player.

Career
In 2002, he was loaned to Bærum SK and helped them win promotion to the Norwegian First Division.

He signed for the French club Le Mans Union Club 72 on June 13, 2008, and joined the club on July 7 the same year.

After spending the 2012 season at a new spell in IK Start, he retired from professional football. He did continue in 2013 with seventh-tier club Tigerberget FK.

National team
Strømstad made his debut for the national team in the World Cup qualifier against Belarus in October 2005.

Playing style
Strømstad is renowned for his work rate and passing ability, and his stamina. He has been compared to former Norwegian midfielder Erik Mykland. When he played for Start he often linked up with teammate Kristofer Hæstad in midfield.

References

External links
Start's bio of Strømstad

1982 births
Living people
Norwegian footballers
Norway international footballers
IK Start players
Bærum SK players
Le Mans FC players
Norwegian expatriate footballers
Expatriate footballers in France
Sportspeople from Kristiansand
Eliteserien players
Ligue 1 players
Norwegian expatriate sportspeople in France

Association football midfielders